Grandin is an unincorporated community located along the border of Franklin and Union townships in Hunterdon County, New Jersey, United States.

The Bethlehem United Presbyterian Church, also known as the Grandin Church, is a contributing property of the Rockhill Agricultural Historic District, listed on the National Register of Historic Places.

The Norfolk Southern Railway's Lehigh Line (formerly the mainline of the Lehigh Valley Railroad), runs through the community.

References

External links
 

Union Township, Hunterdon County, New Jersey
Franklin Township, Hunterdon County, New Jersey
Unincorporated communities in Hunterdon County, New Jersey
Unincorporated communities in New Jersey